Felipes is a genus of lichenized fungi in the order Arthoniales. Circumscribed by Andreas Frisch and Göran Thor in 2014, it contains the single species Felipes leucopellaeus. Genetic analysis shows that the genus falls into the order Arthoniales, but its familial placement is uncertain. Felipes leucopellaeus is found across Europe and North America in temperate and boreal regions, typically in old-growth forest or wooded mires. It is crustose and corticolous.

Systematics 
Felipes leucopellaeus was first described in 1810 by Erik Acharius, who named it Spiloma melaleucum var. leucopellaeum. He later moved it to the genus Arthonia as Arthonia leucopellaea, where most taxonomists listed it for nearly two centuries. However, in 2014, Andreas Frisch and Göran Thor moved it to the monotypic genus Felipes. The genus name is Latin for "cat's paw", a reference to the shape of its ascomata (fruiting structures).

Description
Felipes leucopellaeus is a crustose lichen. Its thallus is whitish to pale yellow or fawn in colour, variously described as being flaky (scurfy), minutely granular (leprose) or somewhat "cobwebby" (arachnoid) in appearance. Fresh growth often has a pinkish tinge, and the lichen has no distinct margin. Its apothecia (the lichen's spore-carrying structures) are dark brown to black in colour, ranging in shape from generally rounded to star-like or lobed.

Ecology
Felipes leucopellaeus is a corticolous lichen, growing on tree bark – particularly acidic tree bark. In Europe, it is found on the bark of mature birch (Betula), oak (Quercus), pine (Pinus) and holly (Ilex) trees, as well as occasionally on old common heather (Calluna) stems. In North America, where it was first recorded in 1988, it has been found on the bark of Betula alleghaniensis (yellow birch) and Picea rubens (red spruce). 

It is uncommon in many of the places it occurs. In Italy, it is considered critically endangered, and it is a red-listed species in Poland and Lithuania. It is sometimes attacked by the lichenicolous species Chaenothecopsis vainioana.

Citations

References cited

 
 
 
 
 
 
 
 

Arthoniomycetes
Lichen genera
Taxa described in 2014